Mark Powell may refer to:

 Mark Powell (clothing designer) (born 1960), British fashion designer
 Mark Powell (photographer) (born 1968), American photographer
 Mark Powell (footballer) (born 1984), Australian footballer
 Mark Powell (cricketer, born 1972), former English cricketer
 Mark Powell (cricketer, born 1980), English cricketer for Northamptonshire, 2000–2004
 Mark Powell (novelist) (born 1976), American novelist
 Mark Allan Powell (born 1953), professor of theology